This article contains a list of compositions by Buddy Miller, Julie Miller, and their collaborators.

Each composition is followed by the album or albums on which it appears.

List of compositions 

Key
1. written by Julie Miller
2. written by Buddy Miller
3. co-written by Julie Miller and Buddy Miller
2. co-written by Julie Miller, Buddy Miller and Jim Lauderdale
5. co-written by Julie Miller and Larry Campbell
6. co-written by Julie Miller, Jim Lauderdale, and K.R. Ladner
7. co-written by Julie Miller and Bill Mallonee
8. co-written by Julie Miller and Bill Frisell
9. co-written by Buddy Miller and Jim Lauderdale
10. co-written by Buddy Miller and Victoria Williams

1–9 

 "100 Million Little Bombs"  3

 1997: Buddy Miller – Poison Love (HighTone)
 2006: Michael Stanley – The Farrago Sessions (Line Level)

A–D 

 "A Kiss on the Lips"  1

 1997: Julie Miller – Blue Pony (HighTone)
 2002: Siobhan Maher Kennedy – Immigrant Flower (BMG)

 "All My Tears"  1

 1995: Emmylou Harris – Wrecking Ball
 1996: Jimmy Scott – Heaven (Warner Bros)
 1999: Julie Miller – Broken Things (HighTone)
 2006: Jars of Clay – Good Monsters (Sony)
 2006: Selah – Bless the Broken Road: The Duets Album (Curb)
 2008: The Gordons – Our Time (Inside-Out Records)
 2009: Po' Girl – Deer in the Night (Po' Girl Music)

 "All the Pieces of Mary"  1

 1997: Julie Miller – Blue Pony (HighTone)

 "Baby Don't Let Me Down"  3

 1997: Buddy Miller – Poison Love (HighTone)

 "Blue Pony"  1

 1997: Julie Miller – Blue Pony (HighTone)

 "Broken Things"  1

 1999: Julie Miller – Broken Things (HighTone)
 2001: Lucy Kaplansky – Every Single Day (Red House)
 2010: Ryan Kelly – In Time (self-released)

 "By Way of Sorrow"  1

 1997: Julie Miller – Blue Pony (HighTone)

 "Chalk"  1

 2009: Buddy & Julie Miller – Written in Chalk (Hightone)

 "Cruel Moon"  3

 1999: Buddy Miller – Cruel Moon (HighTone)
 2006: April Verch – Take Me Back (Rounder)

 "Dancing Girl"  1

 1997: Julie Miller – Blue Pony (HighTone)

 "Dangerous Place  1

 1990: Julie Miller – Meet Julie Miller (Myrrh)

 "Dirty Water"  3

 2001: Buddy & Julie Miller – Buddy & Julie Miller (Hightone)
 2002: John Mayall & The Bluesbreakers – Stories (Eagle)
 2012: Janiva Magness – "Stronger For It" (Alligator)

 "Does My Ring Burn Your Finger"  3

 1999: Buddy Miller – Cruel Moon (HighTone)
 2000: Lee Ann Womack – I Hope You Dance (MCA Nashville)
 2013: Flatt Lonesome – Flatt Lonesome (Pisgah Ridge / Select-O-Hits)

 "Dogtown"  1

 1990: Julie Miller – Meet Julie Miller (Myrrh)

 "Don't Cry for Me"  1

 1990: Julie Miller – Meet Julie Miller (Myrrh)

 "Don't Listen to the Wind"  1

 1995: Buddy Miller – Your Love and Other Lies (HighTone)
 2014: Lee Ann Womack – The Way I'm Livin' (Sugar Hill)

 "Don't Say Goodbye"  1

 2009: Buddy & Julie Miller – Written in Chalk (Hightone)

 "Don't Tell Me"  3

 1997: Buddy Miller – Poison Love (HighTone)
 1998: Lee Ann Womack – Some Things I Know (Decca)

 "Don't Wait"  9

 2004: Buddy Miller – Universal United House of Prayer (New West)

 "Draggin the River"  3

 1997: Buddy Miller – Poison Love (HighTone)

E–G 

 "Ellis County"  1

 2009: Buddy & Julie Miller – Written in Chalk (Hightone)

 "Every Time We Say Goodbye"  1

 2009: Buddy & Julie Miller – Written in Chalk (Hightone)

 "Fall on the Rock"  1

 2004: Buddy Miller – Universal United House of Prayer (New West)

 "Fire and Water"  3

 2004: Buddy Miller – Universal United House of Prayer (New West)

 "Forever Has Come to an End"  1

 2001: Buddy & Julie Miller – Buddy & Julie Miller (Hightone)

 "Forever My Beloved"  1

 1997: Julie Miller – Blue Pony (HighTone)

 "Garage Sale"  2

 1998: James King – The Bluegrass Storyteller (Rounder)

 "Gasoline and Matches"  3

 2009: Buddy & Julie Miller – Written in Chalk (Hightone)
 2011: Arnold McCuller – Soon As I Get Paid (MRI / What's Good)
 2011: Michael Grimm – Michael Grimm (Epic / Syco)
 2013: Julie Roberts – Good Wine & Bad Decisions (Red River / Relativity)
 2013: LeAnn Rimes – Spitfire (Curb)

 "Give Me An Ocean"  1

 1997: Julie Miller – Blue Pony (HighTone)
 2006: Mathilde Santing And The New Traditions – Under Your Charms (Epic)

 "God's Winged Horse"  8

 2001: Buddy Miller – The Majestic Silver Strings (New West)

H–I 

 "He Walks Through Walls"  1

 1991: Julie Miller – He Walks Through Walls (Word)

 "Help Wanted"  3

 1997: Buddy Miller – Poison Love (HighTone)
 2005: Maren Morris – Walk On (Mozzi Blozzi)

 "Holding Up the Sky"  1

 2001: Buddy & Julie Miller – Buddy & Julie Miller (Hightone)

 "Hole in My Head"  9

 1995: Buddy Miller – Your Love and Other Lies (HighTone)
 1999: Dixie Chicks – Fly (Monument)
 2004: Lucy Kaplansky – The Red Thread (Red House)

 "Hush, Sorrow"  1

 2009: Buddy & Julie Miller – Written in Chalk (Hightone)
 2016: Derri Daugherty – Hush Sorrow (Lo-Fidelity)

 "I Call on You"  1

 1997: Julie Miller – Blue Pony (HighTone)

 "I Can't Get Over You"  1

 2002: Buddy Miller – Midnight and Lonesome (HighTone)
 2004: Julie Roberts – Julie Roberts (Mercury)
 2006: Linda Ronstadt and Ann Savoy -Adieu False Heart (Vanguard)

 "I Can't Help It"  1

 1997: Buddy Miller – Poison Love (HighTone)

 "I Can't Slow Down"  3

 1995: Buddy Miller – Your Love and Other Lies (HighTone)

 "I Don't Mean Maybe"  3

 1995: Buddy Miller – Your Love and Other Lies (HighTone)
 2000: Scott Joss – A New Reason to Care (Little Dog)

 "I Know Why The River Runs"  1

 1999: Julie Miller – Broken Things (HighTone)
 2000: Lee Ann Womack – I Hope You Dance (MCA Nashville)

 "I'm Not Getting Any Better at Goodbye"  3

 1997: Buddy Miller – Poison Love (HighTone)

 "I'm Pretending"  3

 1995: Buddy Miller – Your Love and Other Lies (HighTone)

 "I'm Too Used to Loving You"  3

 1997: Buddy Miller – Poison Love (HighTone)

 "I Need You"  1

 1999: Julie Miller – Broken Things (HighTone)
 2012: Chelle Rose – Ghost of Browder Holler (Lil' Damsel Records)

 "In Memory of my Heart"  3

 1999: Buddy Miller – Cruel Moon (HighTone)
 2011: Shanna Strasberg – Shanna Strasberg (Unsprung)

 "Is That You"  3

 2004: Buddy Miller – Universal United House of Prayer (New West)

 "I Still Cry"  1

 1999: Julie Miller – Broken Things (HighTone)
 2000: Ilse DeLange – Livin' On Love (WEA)
 2006: April Verch – Take Me Back (Rounder)

 "I Will Follow You"  1

 1991: Julie Miller – He Walks Through Walls (Word)

J–M 

 "June"  1

 2009: Buddy & Julie Miller – Written in Chalk (Hightone)

 "King of my Heart"  1

 1990: Julie Miller – Meet Julie Miller (Myrrh)

 "Labor of Love"  1

 1986: Silverwind – Set Apart (Sparrow)

 "Last Song"  7

 1997: Julie Miller – Blue Pony (HighTone)

 "Letters to Emily"  1

 1997: Julie Miller – Blue Pony (HighTone)

 "Little Bitty Kiss"  3

 2002: Buddy Miller – Midnight and Lonesome (HighTone)

 "Little Darlin'"  1

 2001: Buddy & Julie Miller – Buddy & Julie Miller (Hightone)

 "Lonesome For You"  6

 1997: Buddy Miller – Poison Love (HighTone)
 1999: Hank Williams III – Risin' Outlaw (Curb)

 "Looking for a Heartache Like You"  4

 1999: Buddy Miller – Cruel Moon (HighTone)
 2003: Patty Loveless – On Your Way Home (Epic)
 2012: Buddy Miller and Jim Lauderdale – Buddy and Jim (New West)

 "Long Time"  1

 2009: Buddy & Julie Miller – Written in Chalk (Hightone)

 "Love Grows Wild"  3

 1997: Buddy Miller – Poison Love (HighTone)
 2010: Dierks Bentley – Up on the Ridge (Capitol)

 "Love in the Ruins"  9

 1997: Buddy Miller – Poison Love (HighTone)

 "Love Snuck Up"  9

 1997: Buddy Miller – Poison Love (HighTone)

 "Love Will Find You"  1

 1990: Julie Miller – Meet Julie Miller (Myrrh)

 "Maggie"  1

 1999: Julie Miller – Broken Things (HighTone)

 "Memphis Jane"  1

 2009: Buddy & Julie Miller – Written in Chalk (Hightone)

 "Midnight and Lonesome"  1

 2002: Buddy Miller – Midnight and Lonesome (HighTone)

 "Midnight Highway"  5

 2015: Larry Campbell and Teresa Williams – Larry Campbell & Teresa Williams (Red House)

 "My Love Will Follow You"  3

 1995: Buddy Miller – Your Love and Other Lies (HighTone)
 1996: Brooks & Dunn – Borderline (Arista)

 "My Psychiatrist"  1

 1990: Julie Miller – Meet Julie Miller (Myrrh)

 "Mystery Love"  3

 1990: Julie Miller – Meet Julie Miller (Myrrh)

N–R 

 "Oh Fait Pitié d'Amour (Love Have Mercy on Me)"  1

 2002: Buddy Miller – Midnight and Lonesome (HighTone)

 "Orphan Train"  1

 1999: Julie Miller – Broken Things (HighTone)
 2008: Allison Moorer – Mockingbird (New Line)

 "Out In the Rain"  1

 1999: Julie Miller – Broken Things (HighTone)

 "Quecreek"  1

 2002: Buddy Miller – Midnight and Lonesome (HighTone)

 "Rachel"  1

 2001: Buddy & Julie Miller – Buddy & Julie Miller (Hightone)

 "Returning"  9

 2004: Buddy Miller – Universal United House of Prayer (New West)

 "Ride The Wind To Me"  1

 1999: Julie Miller – Broken Things (HighTone)
 2000: Ilse DeLange – Livin' On Love (WEA)

S–T 

 "Shelter Me"  3

 2004: Buddy Miller – Universal United House of Prayer (New West)
 2011: Blackie and the Rodeo Kings – Kings and Queens (Dramatico / File Under: Music)
 2011: Selah – Hope of the Broken World (Curb)
 2012: Paul Thorn – "What the Hell Is Goin' On?" (Perpetual Obscurity)
 2012: Suzie Vinnick – Live at Bluesville (self-released)

 "Sometimes I Cry"  9

 1999: Buddy Miller – Cruel Moon (HighTone)
 2001: Toni Catlin – Heartache on the Run (self-released)

 "Somewhere Trouble Don't Go"  1

 1999: Buddy Miller – Cruel Moon (HighTone)
 2008: Gibson Brothers – Iron & Diamonds (Sugar Hill)
 2009: Miranda Lambert – Revolution (Columbia Nashville)
 2012: Joe Bonamassa – Driving Towards the Daylight (Provogue)
 2013: Nick Woodland – Something I Heard (Downhill / Galileo)

 "Song to the Devil (I'm Thru with You)"  3

 1990: Julie Miller – Meet Julie Miller (Myrrh)

 "Strange Lover"  1

 1999: Julie Miller – Broken Things (HighTone)

 "Take Me Back"  1

 1997: Julie Miller – Blue Pony (HighTone)
 1998: Suzy Bogguss – Nobody Love, Nobody Gets Hurt (Capitol)
 2006: April Verch – Take Me Back (Rounder)

 "That's Just How She Cries"  1

 2001: Buddy & Julie Miller – Buddy & Julie Miller (Hightone)

 "The Devil is the Angel"  1

 1997: Julie Miller – Blue Pony (HighTone)

 "The River's Gonna Run"  1

 2001: Buddy & Julie Miller – Buddy & Julie Miller (Hightone)
 2006: Sam Bush – Laps in Seven (Sugar Hill)

 "The Speed of Light"  1

 1999: Julie Miller – Broken Things (HighTone)

 "This Old World"  10

 2004: Buddy Miller – Universal United House of Prayer (New West)

 "Through the Eyes of a Broken Heart"  1

 1995: Buddy Miller – Your Love and Other Lies (HighTone)

 "Too Many Troubles"  3

 2003: The Dixie Hummingbirds – Diamond Jubilation (Rounder)

W–Y 

 "Watching Amy Dance"  2

 1995: Buddy Miller – Your Love and Other Lies (HighTone)

 "Water When the Well is Dry"  2

 2002: Buddy Miller – Midnight and Lonesome (HighTone)

 "What Would Jesus Do"  1

 1990: Julie Miller – Meet Julie Miller (Myrrh)

 "When It Comes to You"  4

 2002: Buddy Miller – Midnight and Lonesome (HighTone)

 "Who Owns Your Heart"  3

 1985: Steve Archer – Action (Home Sweet Home)
 1990: Julie Miller – Meet Julie Miller (Myrrh)

 "Wide River To Cross"  3

 2004: Buddy Miller – Universal United House of Prayer (New West)
 2007: Levon Helm – Dirt Farmer (Vanguard)
 2010: Carrie Rodriguez – Love and Circumstance (Ninth Street Opus / Diverse)
 2012: Balsam Range – Papertown (Mountain Home)
 2012: Diana Krall – Glad Rag Doll (Verve)
 2014: Joel Harrison – Mother Stump (Cuneiform Records)

 "Wild Card"  4

 2002: Buddy Miller – Midnight and Lonesome (HighTone)

 "You Knew the Way to My Heart"  1

 1990: Julie Miller – Meet Julie Miller (Myrrh)

 "You Make My Heart Beat Too Fast"  1

 2001: Buddy & Julie Miller – Buddy & Julie Miller (Hightone)
 2016: Wynonna Judd & The Big Noise – Wynonna & the Big Noise (Curb Records)

 "You're Still Gone"  1

 2016: Shawn Colvin and Steve Earle – Colvin & Earle (Fantasy)

 "You Wrecked Up My Heart"  3

 1995: Buddy Miller – Your Love and Other Lies (HighTone)
 2007: Brigitte DeMeyer – Something After All (BDM)

Sources

External links
 

Miller